In computing, an input device is a piece of equipment used to provide data and control signals to an information processing system, such as a computer or information appliance. Examples of input devices include keyboards, mouse, scanners, cameras, joysticks, and microphones.

Input devices can be categorized based on: 
	 
 modality of input (e.g., mechanical motion, audio, visual, etc.)
 whether the input is discrete (e.g., pressing of key) or continuous (e.g., a mouse's position, though digitized into a discrete quantity, is fast enough to be considered continuous)
 the number of degrees of freedom involved (e.g., two-dimensional traditional mice, or three-dimensional navigators designed for CAD applications)

Keyboard 
 

A keyboard is a human interface device which is represented as a layout of buttons. Each button, or key, can be used to either input an alphanumeric character to a computer, or to call upon a particular function of the computer. It acts as the main text entry interface for most users.

Types 

Keyboards are available in many form factors, depending on the use case. Standard keyboards can be categorized by its size and number of keys, and the type of switch it employs. Other keyboards cater to specific use cases, such as a numeric keypad or a keyer.

Desktop keyboards are typically large, often have full key travel distance, and features such as multimedia keys and a numeric keypad. Keyboards on laptops and tablets typically compromise on comfort to achieve a thin figure.

There are various switch technologies used in modern keyboards, such as mechanical switches (which use springs), scissor switches (usually found on a laptop keyboard), or a membrane.

Other keyboards do not have physical keys, such as a virtual keyboard, or a projection keyboard.

 Ergonomic keyboard  A keyboard placing design emphasis on ergonomics and comfort.
 Chorded keyboard  A keyboard used by pressing several keys together.
 Thumb keyboard  A miniature keyboard found in PDAs and mobile phones.
 Keyer  A chorded keyboard without the board.
 Numeric keypad  While some keyboards include a them (commonly found at the right side), numeric keypads can be found as independent devices.

Pointing device

A pointing device allows a user to input spatial data to a computer. It is commonly used as a simple and intuitive way to select items on a computer screen on a graphical user interface (GUI), either by moving a mouse pointer, or, in the case of a touch screen, by physically touching the item on screen. Common pointing devices include mice, touchpads, and touch screens.

Whereas mice operate by detecting their displacement on a surface, analog devices, such as 3D mice, joysticks, or pointing sticks, function by reporting their angle of deflection.

Types 

Pointing devices can be classified on:

 Whether the input is direct or indirect. With direct input, the input space coincides with the display space, i.e. pointing is done in the space where visual feedback or the pointer appears. Touchscreens and light pens involve direct input. Examples involving indirect input include the mouse and trackball.
 Whether the positional information is absolute (e.g. on a touch screen) or relative (e.g., with a mouse that can be lifted and repositioned)

Direct input is almost necessarily absolute, but indirect input may be either absolute or relative.  For example, digitizing graphics tablets that do not have an embedded screen involve indirect input and sense absolute positions and are often run in an absolute input mode, but they may also be set up to simulate a relative input mode like that of a touchpad, where the stylus or puck can be lifted and repositioned. Embedded LCD tablets, which are also referred to as graphics tablet monitors, are the extension of digitizing graphics tablets. They enable users to see the real-time positions via the screen while being used.

 mouse  A hand-held pointing device that is moved across a surface.
 touchpad or trackpad  A flat surface operated by moving a finger across its surface.
 touch screen  A layer placed over a computer screen, used by physically touching it.
 trackball  Similar to a mouse, a trackball has a ball held by a socket. Instead of moving the mouse, the user rolls the ball with their finger.
 graphics tablet, digitizer, or drawing tablet  A flat surface on which a pen is used, usually to draw images or capture signatures.

Sensors 

A sensor is an input device which produces data based on physical properties.

Sensors are commonly found in mobile devices to detect their physical orientation and acceleration, but may also be found in desktop computers in the form of a thermometer used to monitor system temperature.

Types 

 Accelerometer  Detects acceleration.
 Gyroscope  Detects spatial orientation.
 Magnetometer  Similar to a compass, a magnetometer senses magnetic heading.
 Proximity sensor  Detects whether an object is in proximity.
 Barometer  Measures atmospheric pressure. May be used to determine elevation above sea level.
 Ultrasonic transducer  Detects movement and range of objects using ultrasound.
 LIDAR  Detects the range of objects using laser.
 Thermometer  Measures temperature. Usually uses a thermistor or thermocouple.

Some sensors can be built with MEMS, which allows them to be microscopic in size.

High-degree of freedom input devices 

Some devices allow many continuous degrees of freedom as input. These can be used as pointing devices, but are generally used in ways that don't involve pointing to a location in space, such as the control of a camera angle while in 3D applications. These kinds of devices are typically used in virtual reality systems (CAVEs), where input that registers six degrees of freedom is required.

Composite devices 
Input devices, such as buttons and joysticks, can be combined on a single physical device that could be thought of as a composite device.  Many gaming devices have controllers like this. Technically mice are composite devices, as they both track movement and provide buttons for clicking, but composite devices are generally considered to have more than two different forms of input.

Types 
 Joystick  Consists of a stick pivoting on a stationary base.
 Gamepad, or joypad  Hand held device often used to play modern video games.
 Paddle  A paddle could be a game controller consisting of a dial and a button, or an input device such as a Griffin PowerMate or a Microsoft Surface Dial.
 Racing wheel  An imitation steering wheel that can be used to play racing video games.
 Wii Remote  A remote control used with the Nintendo Wii video game console which integrates an accelerometer and pointing capabilities.

Video input devices 

Video input devices are used to digitize images or video from the outside world into the computer. The information can be stored in a multitude of formats depending on the user's requirement.

Many video input devices use a camera sensor.

Types 
 Digital camera
 Digital camcorder
 Portable media player
 Webcam
 Microsoft Kinect Sensor
 Image scanner
 Fingerprint scanner
 Barcode reader
 3D scanner
 Laser rangefinder
 Eye gaze tracker

Voice recorder 
Voice input devices are used to capture sound. In some cases, an audio output device can be used as an input device, in order to capture produced sound. Audio input devices allow a user to send audio info to a computer for processing, recording, or carrying out commands. Devices such as microphones allow users to speak to the computer in order to record a voice message or navigate software. Aside from recording, audio input devices are also used with speech recognition software.

Types 
 Microphones
 MIDI keyboard or other digital musical instrument

Punched paper 
Punched cards and punched tapes were much used in the 20th century. A punched hole represented a one; its absence represented a zero. There were mechanical and optical readers.

Other types 
 Gesture recognition
 Digital pen
 Magnetic ink character recognition
 Sip-and-puff#Computer input device

See also 
Output device
Peripheral
Sensor
Display device

References

General references

Further reading 
 N. P. Milner. 1988
 A review of human performance and preferences with different input devices to computer systems. In Proceedings of the Fourth Conference of the British Computer Society on People and computers IV, D. M. Jones and R. Winder (Eds.). Cambridge University Press, New York, NY, USA, 341–362. 

 
Articles containing video clips